Willians Domingos Fernandes (born 29 January 1986), known as Willians, is a Brazilian professional footballer who plays as a defensive midfielder for Nova Mutum.

Career

Flamengo
Born in Praia Grande, São Paulo, Willians debuted for Flamengo playing in the first team in the season opener against Friburguense in the 2009 Rio de Janeiro State League.

On the 2009 Brazilian Série A Willians led the league in ball stealing.
On 27 January 2010 Willians renewed his contract with Flamengo for another four years, until December 2014, with a release fee set for €10 million. In March 2011 Willians renewed his contract again. On 7 June 2012, Willians was confirmed by Udinese. In site of italian side, the player was nicknamed as "pitbull" and "bulldog".

Internacional
On 11 January 2012, Willians was bought by circa of 2.5 million euros and will defend, in 2013, Internacional, a Brazilian side. He will be a substitute for Guiñazú, who left the club and current is player of paraguayan side Libertad.

Career statistics
(Correct )

according to combined sources on the Flamengo official website and Flestatística.

 In 2007 and 2008 Willians played for Santo André in the Brazilian Série B.

Honours
Flamengo
 Rio de Janeiro State League: 2009, 2011
 Brazilian Série A: 2009

Internacional
 Campeonato Gaúcho: 2013, 2014

Individual
 2011 Campeonato Carioca Best Defensive Midfielder

References

External links
 Willians at playmakerstats.com (English version of ogol.com.br)
 

1986 births
Brazilian footballers
Brazilian expatriate footballers
Esporte Clube Santo André players
CR Flamengo footballers
Udinese Calcio players
Sport Club Internacional players
Cruzeiro Esporte Clube players
Sport Club Corinthians Paulista players
Expatriate footballers in Italy
Brazilian expatriate sportspeople in Italy
Campeonato Brasileiro Série A players
Serie A players
Living people
Association football midfielders
People from Praia Grande